This page is a partial list of notable alumni and faculty of the University of Virginia.

Rectors and members of the Board of Visitors
 Thomas Jefferson – 3rd President of the United States (1801–1809); founder, Rector (1819–1826)
 James Madison – 4th President of the United States (1809–1817); Rector (1826–1836)
 James Monroe – 5th President of the United States (1817–1825)
Joseph C. Cabell – Rector (1834–1836 & 1845–1856)
 Chapman Johnson – Rector (1836–1845)
 Andrew Stevenson – 15th Speaker of the United States House of Representatives (1827–1833); Rector (1856–1857)
 Thomas Jefferson Randolph – Rector (1857–1864)
 T. L. Preston – Rector (1864–1865)
 Alexander Rives – Rector (1865–1866)
 B. Johnson Barbour – Rector (1866–1872)
 R. G. H. Kean – Rector (1872–1876)
 Alexander H. H. Stewart – Rector (1886–1887)
 John L. Marye – Rector (1888–1890)
 W. C. N. Randolph – Rector (1890–1897)
 Armistead C. Gordon – Rector (1897–1898 & 1906–1918)
 Charles P. Jones – Rector (1898–1906)
 R. Tate Irvine – Rector (1918–1920)
 John Stewart Bryan — Rector and board member (1918–1922) 
C. Harding Walker – Rector (1922–1930)
 Fredric W. Scott – Rector (1930–1939)
 Robert Gray Williams – Rector (1939–1946)
 Edward R. Stettinius Jr. – Rector (1946–1949)
 Baron Foster Black – Rector (1949–1956)
 Frank Talbott, Jr – Rector (1956–1960)
 Albert Vickers Bryan – Rector (1960–1964)
 Charles Rogers Fenwick – Rector (1964–1966)
 Frank W. Rogers – Rector (1966–1970)
 Joseph H. McConnell – Rector (1970–1976)
 William L. Zimmer, III – Rector (1976–1980)
 D. French Slaughter Jr. – Rector (1980–1982)
 Fred G. Pollard – Rector (1982–1987)
 Joshua Darden Jr. – Rector (1987–1990)
 Edward Elliott Elson – Rector (1990–1992)
 Hovey S. Dabney – Rector (1992–1998)
 John P. Ackerly, III – Rector (1998–2003)
 Gordon F. Rainey Jr. – Rector (2003–2005)
 Thomas F. Farrell, II – Rector (2005–2007)
 H. Haywood Fralin – Rector (2007–2009)
 John O. Wynne – Rector (2009–2011)
 Helen Dragas – Rector (2011–2013)
 George Keith Martin – Rector (2013–2015)
 William H. Goodwin – Rector (2015–2017)
 Frank M. "Rusty" Conner – Rector (2017–present)

Notable faculty 

Faculty members who are alumni of the University of Virginia are marked in italics.

American Studies

Athletics

Classics

Economics

Education

English

Engineering

History

Law

Mathematics

Media Studies

Medicine
{| class="wikitable sortable"
|+
|-
! Name
! Position
! class="unsortable"| Notability
! class="unsortable"| 
|-
| style="text-align:center"|     (1941-2015)
|
| 1994 Nobel Prize in Physiology laureate for discovery of G-proteins and the role of these proteins in signal transduction in cells
| style="text-align:center"|
|-
| style="text-align:center"|     (1951-)
|
| 2005 Nobel Prize in Physiology laureate for his research on the role of bacterium Helicobacter pylori in the pathogenesis of peptic ulcer disease 
| style="text-align:center"|
|-
| style="text-align:center"|   '  (1936-)
|
| 1998 Nobel Prize in Physiology laureate for his research on the role of nitric oxide as a signaling molecule in the cardiovascular system
| style="text-align:center"|
|-
| style="text-align:center"|     (1941-)
|
| Former associate director for research on women's health at the National Institutes of Health (NIH) 
| style="text-align:center"|
|-
| style="text-align:center"| 
|
| cardiothoracic surgeon, professor, and medical researcher
| style="text-align:center"|
|}

Philosophy

Physics

Politics

Psychology

 Alumni 

 Space and land exploration 
 Richard E. Byrd (attended) – polar explorer, first to fly over South Pole
 Patrick G. Forrester, Grad 1989 – NASA astronaut
 Karl G. Henize, Col 1947, Grad 1948 – astronomer; NASA astronaut
 Thomas Marshburn, Engr 1984 – NASA astronaut

Notes
 Leland Melvin, Engr 1991 – NASA astronaut
 Bill Nelson, Law 1968 – NASA astronaut; U.S. Senator, Florida
 Gregory Olsen, Grad 1971 – co-founder and Chairman of Sensors Unlimited, Inc.; third private citizen to make a self-funded trip to the International Space Station
 Kathryn C. Thornton, Grad 1977, Grad 1979 – NASA astronaut
 Jeff Wisoff, Col 1980 – NASA astronaut; engineering professor at Rice University

 United States Supreme Court 
 Howell Edmunds Jackson, Grad 1854 – Justice, United States Supreme Court; U.S. Senator of Tennessee
 James Clark McReynolds, Law 1884 – Justice, United States Supreme Court
 Stanley Forman Reed, Law 1908 – Justice, United States Supreme Court; United States Solicitor General

Politics and diplomacy
 Yasushi Akashi, Grad 1956 – Chairman, International House of Japan; former Undersecretary of the United Nations
 George Allen, Col 1974, Law 1977 – Governor and U.S. Senator, Virginia
William Antholis, Col 1986—Director of UVA's Miller Center; former Managing Director Brookings; former White House and State Department staff
 Hanan Ashrawi, Grad 1982 – Official Spokesperson of the Palestinian Delegation to the Middle East Peace Process; peace activist
 Nathan L. Bachman, Law 1903 – U.S. Senator, Tennessee; Justice, Tennessee Supreme Court
 Alben W. Barkley, Law 1900 – 35th Vice-President of the United States; U.S. Senator, Kentucky
 Evan Bayh, Law 1981 – U.S. Senator and Governor, Indiana
 Andy Beshear, Law 2005 – Governor of Kentucky
 Rupert Blue, Col 1890 – Surgeon General of the United States
 Kit Bond, Law 1963 – U.S. Senator, Missouri
 Alan Stephenson Boyd, Law 1948 – first United States Secretary of Transportation
 Harry F. Byrd Jr., Law 1936 – U.S. Senator, Virginia
 James Laurence Cabell, Class 1833 – President of National Board of Health
 Millard F. Caldwell, Law 1924 – Governor, U.S. Congressman, and State Supreme Court Justice, Florida
 Mortimer Caplin, Law 1940 – Internal Revenue Service commissioner, law professor, tax attorney
 James W. Carroll, Col 1985 – Director of the Office of National Drug Control Policy
 James Paul Clarke, Law 1878 – United States Senator and the 18th Governor of Arkansas
 John Cornyn, Law 1995 – U.S. Senator, Texas
 Ken Cuccinelli, Engr 1990 – Attorney General of Virginia
 Hugh S. Cumming, Med 1893 – Surgeon General of the United States
 Joseph T. Curry – member of the Louisiana House of Representatives, 1930–1944 
 William H. Daingerfield, Col 1829 – 2nd Mayor of San Antonio; Ambassador
 Henry Winter Davis, Law 1841 – outspoken Radical Republican; U.S. Congressman, Maryland
 Collins Denny Jr. (1899–1964), Law 1924 – pro-segregationist lawyer
 Mary DeRosa, Col 1981 – former Deputy Counsel to the President for National Security Affairs in the Obama Administration
 Hasjim Djalal, Law 1959 – Indonesian Ambassador to Germany, Canada, and the United Nations; Chairman and President of the International Seabed Authority, international law of the sea expertNational Library of Australia Indonesia & the Law of the Sea Retrieved February 2, 2012
Joseph T. Doyle, Grad 1990 – Pennsylvania State Representative for the 163rd district (1971–1978)
 William A. Eaton, Col 1978 – United States Ambassador to Panama, United States Assistant Secretary of State
 Paul Erickson, Law 1988 – political consultant
 William Meade Fishback, Law 1855 – 17th Governor of Arkansas and U.S. Senator-Elect, Arkansas
 Luis Fortuño, Law 1985 – Governor of Puerto Rico
 Thomas Watt Gregory, Law 1884 – Attorney General of the United States
 Michael E. Guest, Grad 1981 – U.S. Ambassador to Romania; first openly gay man to be confirmed by the U.S. Senate and serve as a U.S. Ambassador
 Barbara Halliday, Mayor of Hayward, California
 Hilary A. Herbert, Law 1855 – Secretary of the Navy
 Mark Herring, Col 1983, Grad 1986 – Attorney General of Virginia, member of the Senate of Virginia
 Robert Mercer Taliaferro Hunter, Col 1828 – Speaker of the United States House of Representatives and U.S. Senator, Virginia
 Eppa Hunton, Law 1843 – CSA Brigadier General; U.S. Congressman and U.S. Senator, Virginia
 Louis A. Johnson, Law 1913 – Second United States Secretary of Defense
 Brereton Jones, Comm 1961 – Governor of Kentucky
 Edward M. Kennedy, Law 1959 – U.S. Senator, Massachusetts
 John Neely Kennedy, Law 1977 – U.S. Senator, Louisiana, State Treasurer of Louisiana
 Robert F. Kennedy, Law 1951 – U.S. Senator, New York; 1968 U.S. presidential candidate, U.S. Attorney General
 Angus King, Law 1969 – 72nd Governor of Maine, United States Senator from Maine
 William Preston Lane Jr., Law 1915 – Governor, Maryland
 J. Hamilton Lewis – U.S. Senator, Illinois and first Whip
 Stephen N. Limbaugh Jr., Law 1988, Missouri Supreme Court Justice
 Sean Patrick Maloney, Col 1988, Law 1992 – U.S. Congressman, New York's 18th congressional district and former White House Office of the Staff Secretary
 Thurgood Marshall Jr., Col 1978, Law 1981 – former White House Cabinet Secretary
 Roy Martin, 131st mayor of Norfolk, Virginia (1962-1974), 31st President of the United States Conference of Mayors (1973-1974)
 Henry M. Mathews, Grad 1856 – Governor of West Virginia
 Samuel D. McEnery, Col 1857 – Governor and U.S. Senator for Louisiana
 Ana Montes, Col 1979 – convicted Cuban spy
 John S. Mosby (attended) – the "Gray Ghost", CSA guerilla fighter
 Robert Mueller, Law 1973 – Director of the Federal Bureau of Investigation
 Janet Napolitano, Law 1983 – President of the University of California System; former Governor of Arizona and Secretary of Homeland Security
 Bill Nelson, Law 1968 – U.S. Senator, Florida; NASA astronaut
 Kirstjen Nielsen, Law 1999 – 6th Secretary of the United States Department of Homeland Security
 Michelle Nunn, Col 1989 – President of CARE USA; former US Senate candidate, Georgia
 Andy Oldham, Col 2001 – Judge on the United States Court of Appeals for the Fifth Circuit
 Longin Pastusiak, Grad 1959 – Marshall of the Senate, Poland
 Ken Paxton, Law 1991 – Attorney General of Texas
 George W. Randolph, Law 1842 – Confederate States Secretary of War
 Thomas Caute Reynolds, Law 1838 – 11th Lieutenant Governor of Missouri; Governor of Missouri (Confederate)
 Chuck Robb, Law 1973 – Governor and U.S. Senator, Virginia
 Joseph Taylor Robinson, Law 1895 – Governor and United States Senate Majority Leader, Arkansas
 Franklin Delano Roosevelt Jr., Law 1940 – U.S. Congressman, New York
 Chuck Rosenberg, Law 1990 – former United States Attorney, Eastern District of Virginia and Southern District of Texas; former Counsel to the FBI Director; former Chief of Staff to the US Deputy Attorney General; former Counselor to the US Attorney General
 Chip Roy, Commerce 1994 – U.S. Congressman, Texas's 21st congressional district
 Larry Sabato, Col 1974 – politics professor; Director of the University of Virginia Center for Politics; called the "Most Quoted College Professor in the Land" by the Wall Street Journal Mark Sanford, Darden 1988 – former Governor of South Carolina
 Thomas A. Saunders III, Darden 1967 – Chairman of The Heritage Foundation
 Eugene Scalia, Col 1985 – 28th United States Secretary of Labor
 Thomas A. Scully, Col 1979 – former Administrator of the Centers for Medicare and Medicaid Services
 James Alexander Seddon, Grad 1836 – 4th Confederate States Secretary of War
 Faryar Shirzad, Law 1992 – advisor to United States President George W. Bush
 Marc Short, Darden 2004 – former White House Director of Legislative Affairs 
 John William Snow, Grad 1965 – United States Secretary of the Treasury
 Javier Solana, Grad 1968 – Spanish former Secretary General of the North Atlantic Treaty Organization and previous European Union foreign policy chief
 William B. Spong Jr., Law 1947 – U.S. Senator, Virginia
 John C. Stennis, Law 1928 – U.S. Senator, Mississippi
 Edward Stettinius Jr., Col 1924 – United States Secretary of State
 Benjamin Franklin Stringfellow, Law 1835 – Missouri Attorney General and Border Ruffian
 Robert M. Switzer, Law – United States Representative
 Charles L. Terry Jr., Col 1922 – Governor, Delaware
 Robert Toombs, Law 1830 – U.S. Senator, Georgia
 John V. Tunney, Law 1959 – U.S. Congressman and U.S. Senator, California
 Thomas B. Turley, Law 1867 – U.S. Senator, Tennessee
 William M. Walton, Law 1851 – Attorney General of Texas
 John Warner, Law 1953 – U.S. Senator, Virginia
 Mac Warner, Law 1991 – Secretary of State of West Virginia
 Lowell P. Weicker Jr., Law 1957 – Governor, U.S. Congressman, and U.S. Senator, Connecticut
 Kevin Whitaker, Col 1979 – United States Ambassador to Colombia
 Sheldon Whitehouse, Law 1982 – Attorney General of Rhode Island, United States Senator from Rhode Island
 John C. White, English 1998 – Louisiana education superintendent since 2012
 John Sharp Williams, Law 1876 – Minority Leader of the United States House of Representatives
 Wayne W. Williams, Law 1989 – Secretary of State of Colorado
 Woodrow Wilson (attended) – 28th President of the United States
 Walter Wyatt, Law 1917 – General Counsel, Federal Reserve System
 Yan Huiqing, Col 1900 – Premier and Prime Minister of the Republic of China; Chinese Ambassador to the United States; 1st Chinese Ambassador to the Soviet Union; Chinese Representative in the League of Nations

Business
 Lee Ainslie, Comm 1986 – founder and managing partner of Maverick Capital
 Eric C. Anderson, Engr 1996 – President and CEO, co-founder, Space Adventures
 David T. Beers, Col 1975 – Special Adviser to the Governor of the Bank of Canada, former head of sovereign credit ratings, Standard & Poor's
 Alfred Berkeley, Col 1966 – President, NASDAQ Stock Exchange
 John H. Bryan, Darden 1960 – CEO and Chairman of Sara Lee
 Algernon S. Buford, Law 1850 – President, Richmond and Danville Railroad
 W. Graham Claytor Jr., Col 1933 – President, Southern Railway and Amtrak; and U.S. Secretary of the Navy
 George David, Darden 1967 – Chairman and CEO, United Technologies Corporation
 William Stamps Farish III, Col 1962 – Chairman of the Board, Churchill Downs, U.S. ambassador to the United Kingdom
 William A. Hawkins, Darden 1982 – CEO, Medtronic Corp.
 Bob Hugin, Darden 1985 – Chair of Celgene
 Mansoor Ijaz, Col 1983 – founder and Chairman, Crescent Investment Management Ltd
 Paul Tudor Jones, Col 1976 – President and founder, Tudor Investment Corporation and the Robin Hood Foundation, billionaire
 Stephen P. Joyce, Comm 1982 – former president and CEO of Choice Hotels as well as CEO of Dine Brands Global
 Randal J. Kirk, Law 1979 – founder, chairman, New River Pharmaceutical; billionaire
 Alan Lafley (attended) – CEO, Chairman of the Board, Procter & Gamble
 Paul Manheim, 1925 - business executive, director and partner, Lehman Brothers, Asian art collector
 Alexander F. Mathews, M.A. 1856 – President and founder of Bank of Lewisburg and First National Bank of Ronceverte
 Halsey Minor, Col 1987 – co-founder and former CEO, CNET Inc.
 Nick Morgan – speaking coach and author
 Daniel Mudd, Col 1980 – CEO, Fannie Mae
 Tammy Murphy, Col 1987 – analyst, associate, and project lead at Goldman Sachs
 William Nelson Page (attended) – civil engineer, co-founder of the Virginian Railway
 Michelle Nunn, Col 1989 – CEO, Points of Light
 Charles T. Pepper, Med 1855 – the original "Dr. Pepper" according to the Dr Pepper Company
 Steven Reinemund, Darden 1978 – Chairman and CEO, PepsiCo Inc.
 Ed Romanoff, Entrepreneur and singer-songwriter
 Julio Mario Santo Domingo, Col 1948 – Colombian businessman, billionaire
 Sheridan Snyder, Col 1958 – entrepreneur and philanthropist
 Samuel Spencer, Engr 1868 – first President, Southern Railway
 Mark B. Templeton, Darden 1978 – President and CEO, Citrix Systems
 Jaffray Woodriff, Comm 1991 – CEO and co-founder of Quantitative Investment Management (QIM)
 Robert R. Young (attended) – Chairman of the Board, C&O Railroad

Science and technology
 John Backus (attended) – inventor of first high-level programming language, FORTRAN, and recipient of the 1977 A.M. Turing Award
 Daniel Barringer, Grad 1888 – proved the existence of meteorites on Earth (Barringer Meteorite Crater)
 Jesse Beams, Grad 1926 – one of five primary physicists selected for the Manhattan Project, pioneer of ultracentrifuge
 William Yancey Brown, Col 1969 - President of Bishop Museum, author and institutional leader
 S. Ward Casscells, Med 1939 – pioneering orthopedic surgeon, introduced arthroscopy of the knee joint into practice in the United States
 Edmund M. Clarke, Col 1967 – FORE Systems Professor of Computer Science Emeritus at Carnegie Mellon University and recipient of the 2007 A.M. Turing Award
 Francis Collins, Col 1970 – Director of the Human Genome Project
 Norman L. Crabill, MAE – engineer, inventor, author
 Heber Doust Curtis, Grad 1902 – astronomer who participated in the "Great Debate" with Harlow Shapley, 1920
 David John Doukas, Col 1975 – Clinical bioethics scholar, Family Physician
 Wade Hampton Frost, Med 1903 – established epidemiology as a science; founding dean of Johns Hopkins School of Public Health
 Matthew P. Hardy, Ph.D. in Biology 1985 – reproductive biologist who has made fundamental contributions in Leydig cell differentiation and function
 J. Hartwell Harrison, Med 1932 – pioneer kidney transplant surgeon, member of Board of Visitors
 Steve Huffman, Engr 2005 – co-founder of Reddit
 Richard Lutz, Col 1971 – deep sea vent researcher, Director of the Institute of Marine and Coastal Sciences
 Janet Akyüz Mattei, Grad 1972 – astronomer; Director, the American Association of Variable Star Observers
 Edward P. Ney, Ph.D 1946 and Faculty 1946–47 – astrophysicist; discovered heavy cosmic ray nuclei
 Haller Nutt (attended 1832-35) -- developer of the Egypto-Mexican cotton hybrid
 Alexis Ohanian, Comm 2005 – co-founder of Reddit
 Charles Pollard Olivier, Grad 1911 – astronomer; founder, American Meteor Society
 Charlie Papazian, nuclear engineer; influential member of the American homebrewing movement
 Phil Plait, Grad 1994 – author of Bad Astronomy and Bad Astronomy blog
 Walter Reed, Med 1869 – discovered transmission of yellow fever
 Mendel Rosenblum, Col 1984 – co-founder of VMware
 Stuart Schreiber, Col 1977 – chemical biologist; founding member of the Broad Institute of Harvard and MIT
Nicole Shelton, M.A 1996, Ph.D. 1998 – Stuart Professor of Psychology at Princeton University 
 Ann M. Valentine, BS 1993 – inorganic chemist
 Alexander N. Vyssotsky, Grad 1927 – astronomer; cataloged Milky Way M dwarf stars
 Beverly R. Wellford, Grad 1816 – sixth President of the American Medical Association
 Thomas W. Whitaker, MS 1929, PhD 1931 – botanist and horticulturist
 Ralph Elmer Wilson, Grad 1910 – astronomer; Wilson crater on the Moon was co-named after him
 Carl A. Wirtanen, Grad 1939 – astronomer; discovered a number of asteroids and comets
 William Wulf, Grad 1966 – designer of BLISS programming language, President of the National Academy of Engineering
 Hugh H. Young, Col 1889, Med 1891 – inventor, author, pioneering surgeon

Writers and academics
 Louis Auchincloss, Law 1941 – novelist, lawyer
 David Baldacci, Law 1986 – novelist
 Donald J. Boudreaux, Law 1992 – economist, professor
 Paul Bowles (attended) – novelist, travel writer, composer
 Charles Augustus Briggs, Col 1860 – Hebrew scholar and theologian
 Erskine Caldwell, attended 1923–1926 – novelist, author of Tobacco Road John T. Casteen III, Col 1965, Grad 1970 – President of the University of Virginia
 John R. Conniff, New Orleans and Baton Rouge educator; president of Louisiana Tech University, 1926–1928; attended University of Louisiana c. 1895
 Philip F. Deaver, Grad 1978, writer and poet
 Heather Derr-Smith, Col 1995 – poet
 Tyler Drumheller, Col 1974 – pre-Iraq war European CIA station chief; author of On the Brink Claudia Emerson, Col 1979 – 2006 Pulitzer Prize winner for poetry
 Linda Fairstein, Law 1972 – prosecutor of sex crimes in Manhattan and best-selling author of crime novels
 Jerry Falwell Jr., Law 1987 – Chancellor and President, Liberty University
 Richard Foerster, A&S 1972 – poet
 Joanne B. Freeman – historian
 William Fuller, Ph.D. 1983, poet; senior vice president and chief fiduciary officer of Northern Trust Corporation
 Elizabeth Garrett, Law 1988 – President of Cornell University; former provost of the University of Southern California
 Emily Giffin, Law 1997 – chick lit author
 Julien Green, Col 1922 – a major figure of French literature of the 20th century
 Roger Harold Hull, Law 1974 – President of Beloit College and Union College
 Thomas M. Humphrey – economist
 Edward P. Jones, Grad 1981 – author, winner of 2004 Pulitzer Prize for fiction, MacArthur Fellow
 Jack Temple Kirby – historian of the Southern United States, awarded the Bancroft Prize for his 2006 book Mockingbird Song: Ecological Landscapes of the South Gloria Cordes Larson, Law 1976 – President of Bentley University
 Helen Matthews Lewis, Master's of Sociology 1949 – sociologist, historian, and activist
 Edgar Odell Lovett, Grad 1895 – mathematician, astronomer, first and longest-tenured President of Rice University
 M. Elizabeth Magill, Law 1995 – Dean of Stanford Law School 
 J. Hillis Miller Sr., Grad 1928 – fourth President of the University of Florida (1947–1953)
 Robert Miskimon (attended) – novelist, journalist, poet
 Blake Morant, Col 1975, Law 1978 – Dean of George Washington University Law School
 Arthur D. Morse - print and television journalist, and author of While Six Million Died: A Chronicle of American ApathyBret Myers (born 1980) - soccer player and professor
 David Nolan, Col 1967 – author and historian
 Breece D'J Pancake (attended) – short-story writer
Marvin Banks Perry Jr., 1940 – President of Goucher College and Agnes Scott College
 Edgar Allan Poe (attended) – poet, author of "The Raven"
 Harrison Randolph, Grad 1892 – thirteenth President of the College of Charleston (1897–1945)
 W. Taylor Reveley, III, Law 1968 – President, The College of William and Mary; former dean and professor of law at William & Mary Law School
 William Craig Rice, Col 1975 – president of Shimer College
 Paul Craig Roberts, economist and political pundit; Undersecretary of the Treasury
Richard Rorty, Longtime professor of Humanities among the most widely discussed and controversial contemporary philosophers author of Achieving our Country
 Alex Sanders, Law 1990 – nineteenth President of the College of Charleston (1992–2001)
 Will Shortz, Law – editor of The New York Times crossword puzzle
 Brooks D. Simpson, Col 1979 – historian
 Robert Sitkoff, Grad 1996 – professor at Harvard Law School and scholar on trusts and estates
 Valerie Smith, Grad 1978 – President, Swarthmore College; former Dean of the college, Princeton University
 Jens Söring – honor student, autobiographer and writer of social issues, convicted murderer without parole
 William Force Stead, Col 1905 – diplomat and poet
 Darcey Steinke, MFA – author
 Henry S. Taylor, Col 1965 – Pulitzer Prize winner for poetry
 William G. Thomas III PhD – history professor at the University of Nebraska–Lincoln, 2016 Guggenheim Fellow.
 Richard E. Wagner, 1966 – economist

Media
 
 

 Robert Aldrich (attended) – film director, writer, and producer of The Dirty Dozen Krystal Ball, Col 2003 – anchor on MSNBC's The Cycle 
 Fred Barnes, Col 1965 – editor, The Weekly Standard John Brenkus, Col 1993 – host, ESPN's Sports Science Margaret Brennan, Col 2002 – Bloomberg TV anchor, In Business with Margaret Brennan Coran Capshaw, Col 1983 – founder, Red Light Management; manager of the Dave Matthews Band, Faith Hill, and Alicia Keys
 Katie Couric, Col 1979 – anchor of CBS Evening News; former host of NBC's The Today Show Virginius Dabney, Col 1921 – editor of Richmond Times Dispatch, author, Pulitzer Prize winner (editorial writing)
 Lane DeGregory, Col 1989, Grad 1995 – Pulitzer Prize–winning journalist
 Deidre Downs (attended) – Miss America 2005
 Kimberly Dozier, 1993 – reporter for CBS News Thomas Frank, Col 1987 – founder and editor, The Baffler Bob Gazzale, Col 1987 – President, American Film InstituteThe Hook, Cover – Back Story Retrieved January 23, 2012
 Richard Glatzer, Grad 1975 – film director, producer, writer, Still Alice, The Fluffer, and Quinceañera W. Douglas Gordon – editor Norfolk Ledger-Dispatch and Richmond Times-Dispatch David M. Granger, Grad 1981 – Editor-In-Chief, EsquireFreeLibrary/PRNewswire, Hearst Magazines Names David Granger Editor In Chief of Esquire Retrieved January 22, 2012
 Bernard Holland – former chief music critic for The New York Times Anushay Hossain – columnist
 Brit Hume, Col 1965 – managing editor, Fox News
 Laura Ingraham, Law 1991 – conservative talk show host
 Mark Johnson, Col 1971 – film producer, Rain Man, Good Morning, Vietnam, and The Chronicles of Narnia; Academy Award recipient
 Robert Llewellyn, photographer, Engineering 1964–1968
 Rich Lowry, Col 1990 – Editor-In-Chief, National Review Jessica Lynch, Col 2000 – Miss New York 2003
 Tyler Mathisen, Col 1976 – co-anchor, Power Lunch; Vice President for Strategic Editorial Initiatives, CNBC
 Mahsa Saeidi-Azcuy, Col – The Apprentice Andrew Scheinman, Law 1973 – TV producer, Seinfeld; Emmy Award recipient
 Tom Shadyac, Col 1981 – director, Ace Ventura: Pet Detective, Patch Adams, Bruce Almighty Leigh-Taylor Smith, Col 2007 – Miss New York 2009
 Melissa Stark, Col 1995 – reporter, ESPN and ABC's Monday Night Football Ron Suskind, Col 1981 – Pulitzer Prize–winning journalist, author
 Michael Vitez, Col 1979 – staff writer, The Philadelphia Inquirer, Pulitzer Prize winner
 Paul Junger Witt, Col 1963 – film producer, Dead Poets Society, Three Kings and Insomnia; TV producer, The Golden Girls, The Partridge Family, Soap, Benson, and Blossom; Emmy Award recipient
 Vern Yip, Col 1990 – interior designer, HGTV home improvement personality

Actors, musicians, and artists

 Will Anderson, lead singer of the pop-rock band Parachute
 David Berman, Col – lead singer of indie-rock band Silver Jews
 Edward Brophy, Col – actor
 Tom Cora, Col – avant-garde cellist and composer
 Sarah Drew, Col 2002 – actress, Grey's Anatomy Tina Fey, Col 1992 – creator, writer, producer and actress, 30 Rock; former head writer, actress, Saturday Night Live Schuyler Fisk, Col 2004 – singer/songwriter
 Jason George, Col 1994 – actor
 Brennan Gilmore, Col 2001 – bluegrass musician; former U.S. diplomat; political activist
 Ann Hould-Ward, Grad 1978 – Broadway costume designer, Tony Award recipient
 Jen Lilley, Col 2007 – actress, General Hospital, Days of Our Lives, The Artist Rod MacDonald, Col 1970 – singer/songwriter
 Stephen Malkmus, Col 1988 – lead singer of indie-rock band Pavement
 Benjamin McKenzie, Col 2001 – actor, Fox's The O.C. Georgia O'Keeffe (attended) – painter
 Nelson Saiers, Col 1997, Grad 1998 – artist and hedge fund manager
 Teddy Sears, Col 1999 – actor, Masters of Sex Skipp Sudduth, Grad 1983 – actor
 Boyd Tinsley, violinist, mandolinist, backup vocals for Dave Matthews Band
 Sean Patrick Thomas, Col 1993 – actor
 Stan Winston, Col 1968 – special effects expert, four-time Academy Award recipient
 Dylan Walsh, Col 1986 – actor, Nip/Tuck Sasheer Zamata, Col 2008 – actor, Saturday Night LiveAthletics
 
 
 
 Val Ackerman, Col 1981 – founder and former president of WNBA, and current commissioner of the Big East Conference
 Jeff Agoos (born 1968) - Swiss-born American soccer defender 
 Bruce Arena – coached the Virginia Cavaliers to 5 NCAA men's soccer championships; head coach of US national men's soccer team; professional soccer coach 
 Cory Alexander – former NBA player, 29th pick in the 1995 NBA Draft
 Darion Atkins – basketball player for Hapoel Holon of the Israeli Ligat HaAl
 Ronde Barber, Comm 1996 – cornerback, Tampa Bay Buccaneers
 Tiki Barber, Comm 1997 – former running back, New York Giants; current sportscaster
 Morgan Brian 2014 – member of the US Women's National Soccer Team
 Malcolm Brogdon 2016 – guard, Milwaukee Bucks; #15 jersey retired by UVA
 Heather Burge – former WNBA player 
 Heidi Burge, Col 1993 – former WNBA player
 Chris Canty – former NFL defensive end
 Rick Carlisle, Col 1984 – former NBA player; current head coach, Dallas Mavericks
 John Choma – retired NFL offensive linemen, San Francisco 49ers
 Casey Crawford – former NFL tight end
 Mike Cubbage – former MLB third baseman and manager
 Virginius Dabney – running back
 Chris Dey, Col 1989 – President, New York Islanders (NHL)
 Somdev Devvarman, Col 2008 – tennis professional with a career high ranking of 62 in the world
 Bill Dudley, Educ 1942 – NFL Hall of Fame player 
 Mamadi Diakite, 2020 – NBA player
 Jeffrey Eggleston, 2007 – long-distance runner
 Carlton Elliott – defensive end, Green Bay Packers
 Alecko Eskandarian, Col (attended) – MLS #1 overall draft pick, player with D.C. United and U.S. national team
 Paul Ereng, Col 1993 – gold medalist in 800 meters at 1988 Summer Olympics
 D'Brickashaw Ferguson, Col 2006 – offensive tackle, New York Jets
 Mustapha Farrakhan Jr. – guard for the Bakersfield Jam
 Tim Finchem, Law 1973 – Commissioner of the PGA Tour
Zack Gelof - baseball player
 Conor Gill, Col 2002 – won the Major League Lacrosse Rookie of the Year Award in 2002; named MLL MVP in 2004
 Robert Kent Gooch – quarterback
 Jim Grobe, 1975, 1978 – current head coach of the Wake Forest Demon Deacons football team
 Al Groh, Comm 1967 – former head coach of New York Jets, former head coach of Virginia football team
 Margaret Groos – winner of the 1988 U.S, Olympic Trial marathon and 1988 U.S. Olympic team member; former world indoor record holder for 5,000 meters. 
 Kyle Guy, NBA player for Sacramento Kings
 Brandon Guyer – outfielder for the Tampa Bay Rays
 Darryl Hammond, Col 1988 – Arena Football League career tackles leader
 John Harkes – former soccer player and captain of U.S. national team
 Joe Harris 2014 – guard, Brooklyn Nets
DeAndre Hunter, NBA player for the Atlanta Hawks
 Adam Haseley – baseball player in the Philadelphia Phillies organization 
 Ty Jerome, NBA player for the Phoenix Suns
 Mike Jones – professional wrestler; wrestles under the names Virgil, Vincent, and Curly Moe
 Thomas Jones – running back, Kansas City Chiefs
 Henry Jordan – retired NFL defensive lineman, Pro Football Hall of Fame
 Melanie Kok – silver medalist in rowing at 2008 Summer Olympics
 Joe Koshansky – first baseman for the San Francisco Giants farm system (formerly with the Colorado Rockies)
 Bowie Kuhn – Law 1950, former Commissioner of Major League Baseball 
 Braxton Key – professional basketball player
 Jeff Lamp – former NBA player
 Noel LaMontagne – retired NFL offensive lineman, Cleveland Browns
 Sylven Landesberg, American-Israeli basketball shooting guard (Maccabi Tel Aviv)
 Chris Long, defensive end for the Philadelphia Eagles
 Javier López – relief pitcher for the San Francisco Giants
 John Loyd – tackle
 Wali Lundy – running back, Houston Texans
 Buck Mayer – running back
 Tom McKnight, Com 1976 – Champions Tour golfer
 Tony Meola, Col 1989 – Major League Soccer and World Cup goalkeeper
Jerome Meyinsse, 2010 - basketball player in the Israeli Basketball Premier League
 Heath Miller, Col 2004 – tight end, Pittsburgh Steelers
 Eugene Monroe, Col 2008 – offensive Tackle, Jacksonville Jaguars 
 Trey Murphy III – NBA player
 Shawn Moore, former NFL and CFL player, former All-American at UVA
 Herman Moore, Col 1991 – NFL former record-holder for catches in a season
 Ed Moses, Educ 2004 – Olympic gold medalist in swimming
 Ben Olsen (attended) – international soccer player; former player and current coach of D.C. United
London Perrantes (born 1994) - basketball player for Hapoel Gilboa Galil of the Israeli Basketball Premier League
 John Phillips – NFL tight end
 Shamek Pietucha, Col 1999 – Olympic swimmer
 Chris Rotelli, 2003 – professional lacrosse player
 John Beverly Pollard – quarterback
 Sonny Randle, 1958 – football, NFL wide receiver
 Claudio Reyna (attended) – international soccer player; former captain of U.S. national team
 LaRoy Reynolds – middle linebacker for the Atlanta Falcons
 Mark Reynolds – third baseman for the St. Louis Cardinals
 Eppa Rixey, Col 1912 – Hall of Fame baseball pitcher
Jake Rozhansky (born 1996) - American-Israeli soccer player
 Ralph Sampson, Col 1983 – NBA #1 overall draft pick, All-Star center with Houston Rockets and member of the Hall of Fame
 Becky Sauerbrunn, defender for the Utah Royals and US women's national team
 Matt Schaub, Col 2003 – quarterback, Houston Texans
 Michael Schwimer, 2008 – relief pitcher for the Philadelphia Phillies
 Mike Scott – NBA player for the Atlanta Hawks
 Don Shula – head coach of the Baltimore Colts and Miami Dolphins; career wins leader among NFL coaches; defensive backs coach for the 1958 Virginia Cavaliers football team
 Chris Slade, Col 1993 – defensive end / linebacker NFL All Pro New England Patriots
 Michael Slive, Law 1965 – outgoing commissioner of the Southeastern Conference (SEC) (retiring in 2015)
 Devin Smith, professional basketball player for Maccabi Tel Aviv
 Emily Sonnett, Col 2015 — defender for the Portland Thorns and US women's national team
 Dawn Staley, Col 1992 – Olympic gold medalist, carried U.S. flag at opening ceremonies of 2004 Summer Olympics
 Chris Taylor – shortstop / outfielder for the Los Angeles Dodgers
 Bradley Walker – former referee
 DeMya Walker, Col 1999 – WNBA player
 Lesley Welch Lehane – winner of the NCAA and TAC National Championships in cross-country, 1982
 George Welsh – former head football coach
 Ralph C. Wilson Jr. – founding owner of the Buffalo Bills, namesake of Ralph Wilson Stadium
 Monica Wright, Col 2010 – WNBA player, currently UVa's all-time career leader in points for women
 Ryan Zimmerman, Col 2005 – third baseman for the Washington Nationals

Military
 Fernando Bolivar – Venezuelan military, nephew of General Simon Bolivar
 Philip St. George Cocke, 1828, brigadier general in the Confederate States Army during the American Civil War.
 Gen. Robert Magnus, USMC, Col 1969 – Assistant Commandant of the Marine Corps
 VADM John Morgan, USN, Col 1972 – former Deputy Chief of Naval Operations for Information, Plans and Strategy
 John Singleton Mosby, was a Confederate army cavalry battalion commander in the American Civil War. His command, the 43rd Battalion, Virginia Cavalry, known as Mosby's Rangers.
 John B. Magruder, A Confederate Army general during the Civil War
 Lt. Gen. Charles Pede, USA, Col 1984, Law 1987 - Judge Advocate General of the United States Army
William Pegram, was a artillery officer in Robert E. Lee's Confederate Army of Northern Virginia during the American Civil War.
Carnot Posey, was a planter and lawyer, and a Confederate general in the American Civil War. He was transported to University of Virginia, where he had gone to law school. Later being buried at the school.

Religion
 Lloyd Rutherford Craighill – second Bishop of Anking, China
 Carl P. Daw Jr. – Executive Director of the Hymn Society in the United States and Canada
 Collins Denny (1889–1891) – Bishop of the Methodist Episcopal Church, South (1910–1939)
 David Ellenson – professor, President Emeritus and Chancellor of Hebrew Union College-Jewish Institute of Religion
 James Addison Ingle – first Bishop of the Missionary District of Hankow, China
 J. William Jones – Confederate chaplain, campus minister, Christian author

Environmentalism
 Michael P. Branch – ecocritic, writer, activist
 Gary L. Francione, M.A. and J.D. – legal theorist, law professor, and animal rights/vegan activist
 Robert F. Kennedy Jr., Law 1982 – Chairman, Waterkeeper Alliance; co-host of Ring of Fire; Chief Prosecuting Attorney, Riverkeeper
 William A. Welch – engineer and environmentalist who had a major impact on the state and national park systems of the United States

Other
Jason Kessler, neo-Nazi, white supremacist.
Richard B. Spencer, Col 2001 – Neo-Nazi, White nationalist, founder of AlternativeRight.com, President and Director of the National Policy Institute
Otto Warmbier, imprisoned in North Korea in 2016 on a charge of subversion. Released 2017 in a vegetative state and died soon afterward.

Fictional
 Joey Berglund, character in Freedom by Jonathan Franzen
 Biff Loman, character in Death of a Salesman by Arthur Miller
 Elizabeth McCord, portrayed by Téa Leoni, and Henry McCord, portrayed by Tim Daly, on Madam Secretary Clarice Starling, protagonist of the novels The Silence of the Lambs and Hannibal by Thomas Harris, and the film adaptations The Silence of the Lambs, portrayed by Jodie Foster, and Hannibal, portrayed by Julianne Moore
 Gina Toscano, portrayed by Jorja Fox, on The West Wing''

Enslaved laborers
 Isabella and William D. Gibbons
 Memorial to Enslaved Laborers

References

External links
  

University of Virginia